Kostelanetz is a surname. Notable people with the surname include:

 Andre Kostelanetz (1901–1980), Russian-born American popular orchestral music conductor and arranger
 Boris Kostelanetz (1911–2006), tax lawyer
 Richard Kostelanetz (born 1940), American artist, author, and critic